Dudenhofen is a municipality in Rhineland-Palatinate, Germany. It is situated about 3 kilometers west of Speyer. Dudenhofen is the seat of the Verbandsgemeinde ("collective municipality") Römerberg-Dudenhofen.

Notable people 

  Jürgen Creutzmann (born 1945), member of the state parliament of Rhineland-Palatinate from 1989 to 2009, vice president of the state parliament from 2001 to 2006 and member of the Europaparlie from 2009 to 2014. 
 Edward Duyker (born 1955), Australian writer and historian. Wrote in his biography François Péron about the occupation of Dudenhofens in 1793.
 Jan van Eijden (born 1976), former course cyclist, Olympic champion in Sydney 2000, coach of the British National Cycling Team. 
 Olaf Schmäler (* 1969), former Bundesliga footballer, was a youth coach at football club FV Dudenhofen.
 Nikolaus von Weis (1796-1869), Catholic theologian, Bishop of Speyer, was pastor in Dudenhofen.

References

Rhein-Pfalz-Kreis